Dargajogihalli is a census town in Bangalore Rural district  in the state of Karnataka, India.

Demographics 
 India census, Dargajogihalli had a population of 6205. Males constitute 51% of the population and females 49%. Dargajogihalli has an average literacy rate of 64%, higher than the national average of 59.5%: male literacy is 71% and, female literacy is 58%. In Dargajogihalli, 15% of the population is under 6 years of age.

References 

Doddaballapura Taluk